The following is a summary of the 2009 season by Paraguayan football (soccer) club Olimpia Asunción.

Olimpia participated in the following competitions in 2009: Torneo Apertura and Torneo Clausura (pertaining to the Paraguayan first division).

Torneo Apertura 2009 

Olimpia started the year 2009 with the same coach as 2008, Ever Hugo Almeida. However, after only 4 rounds the directive board decided to replace Almeida with Uruguayan Gregorio Pérez, despite the team being in second position with an undefeated record of two wins and two draws.

Transfers 
The following transfers occurred prior to the start of the Apertura tournament:

In:
  José María Buljubasich From  Universidad Católica
  Mario Jara From  Club 12 de Octubre
  Ebelio Ordóñez From  Deportivo Quito
  Celso González Ferreira From  Club Libertad
  Juan Cardozo From  Nacional
  Martín Ligüera  From  Nacional
  Cristian Ledesma  From  Independiente
  Juan Daniel Cáceres  From  Club Guaraní
  Carlos Figueroa From  Club Xelajú MC
  Carlos Ruiz  From  Toronto FC
  Oswaldo Vizcarrondo  From  Caracas FC

Out:
  Raúl Amarilla Romero To  Écija Balompié
  Cristian Leiva To  Godoy Cruz
  Edison Giménez To  Deportes Tolima
  Martin Albano Pautasso To  Belgrano
  José Sasiain  To  12 de Octubre
  Derlis Cardozo To  Argentinos Juniors
  Franco Mendoza  To  Emelec
  José Fabián Ramírez To  Almagro
  César Zayas To  Rubio Ñú

Team roster 

 Coach: Gregorio Pérez

Standing 
Updated March 15  Source:

Results

Top scorers 
Top scorers for Olimpia in the Apertura tournament:

Torneo Clausura 2009 
The Torneo Clausura is to be played in the second half of 2009.

References

See also 
 2008 Club Olimpia season

2009
Olimpia